Coach of the Year is a 1980 American TV film about a paraplegic coach, starring Robert Conrad, Erin Gray, Red West and Daphne Reid.

The film was very popular.

Plot 
Jim Brandon (Robert Conrad), a former player for the Chicago Bears, is a returning veteran who has been paralyzed in the  Vietnam War. Upon his return to his home town, he tries to get a job as a football coach, but does not get it. He comes up with the idea of becoming the football coach at the Illinois State Training School for Boys in St. Charles after a visit there. Coach Brandon tries to become accepted by the young delinquents at the prison, while coaching them to succeed on the football field.

Cast 
 Robert Conrad as Jim Brandon
 Erin Gray as Paula DeFalco
 Red West as Superintendent Turner
 Daphne Reid as Merissa Lane 
 David Raynr as Munroe Sweetlife Johnson  
 Ricky Paull Goldin as  Andy DeFalco 
 Alex Paez as Hector Estrada
 Richard Marx as himself (credited as Richard Marks)

Production 
 The movie was filmed in Batavia, Illinois, including a scene in Dick's Townhouse Tavern, and St. Charles, Illinois, including scenes at the Illinois Youth Center.

It was produced by John Ashley a former actor who was an old friend of Conrad's.

References

External links

1980 films
1980 television films
1980 drama films
Films about paraplegics or quadriplegics
Films directed by Don Medford
Films about sportspeople
American football films
Films set in Illinois
American drama television films
1980s American films
Films about disability